For Stanhopea inodora Rchb.f, see Stanhopea graveolens.Stanhopea ruckeri'' is a species of orchid occurring from Mexico to Central America.

References

External links 

reichenbachiana
Orchids of Central America
Orchids of Belize
Orchids of Mexico
Flora of Central America